Carlos Esquivel Silva (born 10 April 1982) is a Mexican former professional footballer who played as a winger.

Club career
Esquivel uprooted through the younger divisions of Toluca, and debuted in Apertura 2005 with then coach Américo Gallego. That season precisely Toluca became champions. Esquivel stayed there until Clausura 2008 when Esquivel was sent on loan to Tigres UANL for that one season. He returned to Toluca afterwards.

On 13 December 2017, Esquivel was loaned to Veracruz in a 6-month deal.

In June 2019, Esquivel joined UAEM of Ascenso MX.

International career
Esquivel made four appearances for the Mexico national team in the 2009 CONCACAF Gold Cup where Mexico won its fifth title.

Career statistics

International

International goals
Scores and results list Mexico's goal tally first.

Honours
Toluca
Mexican Primera División: Apertura 2005, Apertura 2008, Bicentenario 2010

Mexico
CONCACAF Gold Cup: 2009, 2015
CONCACAF Cup: 2015

References

External links
 

1982 births
Living people
Footballers from Michoacán
Mexican footballers
People from Tlalpujahua
Association football wingers
Mexico international footballers
CONCACAF Gold Cup-winning players
2009 CONCACAF Gold Cup players
2015 CONCACAF Gold Cup players
Atlético Mexiquense footballers
Deportivo Toluca F.C. players
Tigres UANL footballers
C.D. Veracruz footballers
Liga MX players